Erynnis icelus, also known as the dreamy duskywing or aspen dusky wing, is a species of butterfly in the family Hesperiidae. It is found in boreal North America, from the Northwest Territories east across southern Canada to Nova Scotia, south in the western mountains to southern Arizona and southern New Mexico, south in the east to Arkansas, north-eastern Alabama and northern Georgia.

The wingspan is 29–38 mm. There is one generation with adults on wing from April to early July. There might be a rare second generation in the southern Appalachian Mountains.

The larvae are pale green with multiple white dots. Its heart is visible as a green, middorsal stripe.

The larvae feed on Salix, Populus and sometimes Betula species. Adults feed on nectar from flowers of blueberry, wild strawberry, blackberry, Labrador tea, dogbane, New Jersey tea, winter cress, purple vetch and lupine.

References

External links

Nearctica
BugGuide
Dreamy Duskywing, Butterflies of Canada

Erynnis
Butterflies described in 1870
Butterflies of North America
Taxa named by Samuel Hubbard Scudder